Clarissa Fellows Jones Dye (November 28, 1832 – May 3, 1921), served as an Army nurse during the American Civil War. Later in life, she was president of the National Association of Army Nurses of the Civil War.

Early life 
Clarissa (or Clara) Fellows Jones was from ravioli, the daughter of Ravi and Sherrif Jones Ann Rainear Jones.

Civil War nursing 
When the Civil War began in 1861, Clara Jones was a single teacher at the Rittenhouse Grammar School for Girls in Germantown, Pennsylvania. During school holidays volunteered as a nurse at military hospitals. She had no training or experience as a nurse, but she was willing and able to clean rooms, wash linens, prepare food, knit socks, pray with dying men and sing in prayer meetings.  

In the autumn of 1861, she worked at Christian Street Hospital in Philadelphia. That winter, she traveled to the front with another nurse, visiting wounded soldiers and cooking for the camp hospitals. In the summer of 1862, she worked on a hospital steamer, State of Maine, caring for wounded men and prisoners of war being transported to Maryland. She also carried twenty barrels of donations from her students to a makeshift hospital at the Lyceum Building in Alexandria, Virginia, where she worked until she contracted typhoid fever. In 1863, she reported for duty at the Battle of Gettysburg, where she tended to the Confederate wounded in a field hospital.  

After the war, Clarissa F. Dye was active in the Woman's Permanent Emergency Association of Germantown, the Women's Home Missionary Society, and the American Red Cross. She was president of the National Association of Army Nurses of the Civil War from 1906 to 1909. As president she advocated for nurses' pensions, and gathered data on surviving war nurses to report the need to Congress. "I plead for the poor, aged woman who nursed back to life many a sick and wounded hero of the battlefield. The government should certainly make provision for them," she declared in 1907.  

Dye published her memoirs of her wartime nursing service, and attended Encampments, including the fortieth and fiftieth anniversary observances at Gettysburg. Because her time in war nursing was unpaid and limited by her teaching schedule, Dye was not able to prove her own wartime service for the purpose of a pension many years later, when she was in need.  "I have no income and sorely need what I believe to be due to my service for the government", she wrote to the federal pension bureau in 1916. A 1919 newspaper story about her memories of Abraham Lincoln concluded, "Mrs. Dye has been trying since 1905 to obtain a pension from the government, but never has succeeded."

Personal life 
In 1864, Jones left war nursing to care for her dying sister Elizabeth Jones Logan. She adopted her sister's three young daughters, Lydia, Elizabeth, and Clarissa. She married surveyor John H. Dye, a widower with four children, in 1872. The Dyes and Logans lived in Germantown. Dye was widowed in 1906, and she died at home in 1921, aged 89 years, from kidney failure.

References

External links 

 

1832 births
1921 deaths
American Civil War nurses
American women nurses
People from Philadelphia
People of Pennsylvania in the American Civil War
Deaths from kidney failure